Eduardo Gómez may refer to:

 Eduardo Gómez (actor) (1951–2019), Spanish actor
 Eduardo Gómez (footballer) (born 1958), Chilean footballer
 Eduardo C. Gomez, U.S. Army soldier and recipient of the Medal of Honor